Menafabad (also Romanized as Menāfābād) is a village in Howmeh Rural District, in the Central District of Gilan-e Gharb County, Kermanshah Province, Iran. At the 2006 census, its population was 56, in 12 families.

References 

Populated places in Gilan-e Gharb County